BREAK IT ALL: The History of Rock in Latin America is a 2020 docuseries starring Rubén Albarrán, Humberto Carderon and Gustavo Santaolalla.

Cast 
 Rubén Albarrán
 Humberto Carderon
 Gustavo Santaolalla
 Javier Batiz
 Tito Fuentes
 Aníbal Kerpel
 Roco Pachukote
 Paco Ayala
 Hector Buitrago
 Andrés Calamaro
 Andrea Echeverri
 León Gieco
 Álvaro Henríquez
 Camilo Lara
 Lino Nava
 Fernando 'Fher' Olvera

Episodes

Release 
BREAK IT ALL: The History of Rock in Latin America was released on December 16, 2020, on Netflix.

References

External links
 
 

2020 American television series debuts
2020 American television series endings
2020s American documentary television series
Documentary television series about music
Netflix original documentary television series
Spanish-language Netflix original programming
Works about the music industry
Works about rock music
Works about singers
Works about guitars and guitarists